Hamid Reza Arabnia is a professor of computer science at the University of Georgia, United States.
He has been the editor-in-chief of The Journal of Supercomputing since 1997.

References

External links 
 
 

1958 births
Living people
University of Georgia faculty
American computer scientists